Light TV is a commercial television network in the Philippines. It formerly used the frequency of VHF 11 in 1998. They moved to UHF 33 in 2005 after GMA Network Inc. and this network had a blocktime agreement, and use the Citynet Television frequency as their repeater station. The following is the list of programs broadcast by Light TV. For the programs aired on Channel 11 see List of programs aired by ZOE TV and A2Z

Currently aired programs

Newscasts
 Bangon Na Pilipinas (Light TV Radio) (2019-2020, 2020)
 Rekta Kay Atty. Belgica (Light TV Radio) (2022)
 News Light sa Umaga (Light TV Radio) (2019-2020, 2020)

Public affairs
 Diyos at Bayan (1998; also broadcast on A2Z)
 Legal Guide PH

Music and Entertainment
 Shuffle (2022; also broadcast on A2Z)
 Plus Network
 Against The Flow
 Snap Chat

Talk
 Insight Word, Insight Talk
 Choose Day
 Usapang Pamilya
 It's Mys Space Show
 Proyekto Pilipino

Kids
 Awana at Home (2021)
 Kidz Connect (2021)
 Children's Church Online (2020)
 Dokyu Bata TV
 Super Simple Science Stuff
 J-12 Kids
 Bible Ninja

Religious
 Bro. Eddie Villanueva Classics (2020; also broadcast on A2Z)
 Count Your Blessings (2021)
 Daylight Devotion (Light TV Radio) (2019)
 Heart of Wisdom (2021)
 Jesus The Healer (1998; also broadcast on A2Z)
 JIL Live Worship and Healing Service (2018; simulcast on A2Z)
 Prayerline (2018)
 River of Worship (2015)
 Straight from the Word (Light TV Radio) (2020)
 Worship Word & Wonders (2018)
 Faith Matters Too
 House of Praise
 Good News ang Mabuting Balita
 Equip
 The Covenant Word of God
 Enlighten
 Hesus Ikaw ang Kanlungan
 Journey TV
 Lifegiver
 Doulos Cell Celebration
 Word For The Seasons
 City Sanctuary

Foreign
 Mega Harvest Church
 How It Became From a Sin
 Victory Kids Church
 Global Surge Preaching Episodes
 Why Israel Matters
 Heart Stone

Kids from Smile of a Child and CBN Asia
 Auto-B-Good (2011)
 VeggieTales (2014)
 Animated Bible Stories
 3-2-1 Penguins
 Bugtime Adventures
 Little Women
 God Rocks
 Dooley's and Pals
 Creation Creatures
 Lads TV
 1001 Nights
 Paws and Tales
 The Flying House (1998–2005; 2010–2014, 2019; also aired on A2Z)
 Superbook (1998–2005; 2010–2014, 2019; also aired on A2Z via Reimagined series)

Movies
 Light Cinema Specials (2011)

Previously aired on ZOE TV and Light TV

See also
 DZOE-TV (also known as A2Z)
 DZOZ-DTV (main TV channel/TV station owned & operated by ZOE Broadcasting Network)
 DZJV 1458 (radio station owned & operated by ZOE Broadcasting Network)
 DWZB 91.1 (secondary radio station owned & operated by ZOE Broadcasting Network)
 ZOE Broadcasting Network

References

Lists of television series by network
ZOE Broadcasting Network